Castell Folkes (born 29 July 1944) is a Jamaican cricketer. He played in thirteen first-class matches for the Jamaican cricket team from 1967 to 1971.

See also
 List of Jamaican representative cricketers

References

External links
 

1944 births
Living people
Jamaican cricketers
Jamaica cricketers
Cricketers from Kingston, Jamaica